Maija Sofia Makela is an Irish folk singer-songwriter from County Galway.

Early life
Maija Sofia Makela was born in County Galway and went to school in Headford. After finishing school Sofia moved to Dublin for a time before moving to England. She lived in London for two years before returning to Dublin to study English Literature in Trinity College Dublin.

Career

Her debut album Bath Time was described as "a collection of songs exploring the female experience throughout art, history and folklore"; it was nominated for the Choice Music Prize.
Bath Time featured songs relating to marginalised women such as Elizabeth Siddall and Bridget Cleary.

Discography
EPs

sentient light (2014)
The Sugar Sea (2015)

Studio albums

Bath Time (2019)

References

External links

 Maija Sofia

1995 births
21st-century Irish women singers
Living people
Musicians from County Galway
Feminist musicians
Irish women singer-songwriters